Caddoa Creek is a stream in the U.S. state of Colorado.

Caddoa Creek derives its name from the Caddo Indians, who camped near its banks.

See also
List of rivers of Colorado

References

Rivers of Baca County, Colorado
Rivers of Bent County, Colorado
Rivers of Colorado